Australian Provincial compete in the Claxton Shield Baseball Championship in Australia. Provincial were formed for the 2002 International Baseball League of Australia Championship, since 2003 they have competed in the Claxton Shield.

In 2008, the Australian Baseball Federation announced Australia Provincial would not be competing in the 2009 Claxton Shield.

History

Last Roster
This is Australia Provincial's last roster, a 22-man roster for the 2008 Claxton Shield, announced by Baseball Australia.

2008 Claxton Shield squad

References

Baseball teams in Australia
Baseball teams established in 2002
2002 establishments in Australia